Bidston and St James (previously Gilbrook and St James, 1973 to 1979, and Bidston, 1979 to 2004) is a Wirral Metropolitan Borough Council ward in the Birkenhead Parliamentary constituency.

Councillors

Election Results

References

Wards of Merseyside
Birkenhead
Politics of the Metropolitan Borough of Wirral
Wards of the Metropolitan Borough of Wirral